Method chaining, also known as the named parameter idiom, is a common syntax for invoking multiple method calls in object-oriented programming languages. Each method returns an object, allowing the calls to be chained together in a single statement without requiring variables to store the intermediate results.

Rationale 

Local variable declarations are syntactic sugar.
 
Method chaining eliminates an extra variable for each intermediate step. The developer is saved from the cognitive burden of naming the variable and keeping the variable in mind.

Method chaining has been referred to as producing a "train wreck" due to the increase in the number of methods that come one after another in the same line that occurs as more methods are chained together.

A similar syntax is method cascading, where after the method call the expression evaluates to the current object, not the return value of the method. Cascading can be implemented using method chaining by having the method return the current object itself. Cascading is a key technique in fluent interfaces, and since chaining is widely implemented in object-oriented languages while cascading isn't, this form of "cascading-by-chaining by returning " is often referred to simply as "chaining". Both chaining and cascading come from the Smalltalk language.

While chaining is syntax, it has semantic consequences, namely that requires methods to return an object, and if implementing cascading via chaining, this must be the current object. This prevents the return value from being used for some other purpose, such as returning an error value.

Examples
A common example is iostream in C++, where for example << returns the left object, allowing chaining.

Compare:
a << b << c;
equivalent to:
a << b;
a << c;

Another example in JavaScript uses the built-in methods of Array:
somethings
  .filter(x => x.count > 10)
  .sort((a, b) => a.count - b.count)
  .map(x => x.name)

See also
 Fluent interface
 Pipeline (Unix)
 Nesting (computing)
 Builder pattern
 Pyramid of doom (programming)

References

External links
 Creating DSLs in Java using method chaining concept
 Method Chaining in PHP

Method (computer programming)
Articles with example C++ code
Articles with example Ruby code
Articles with example Java code
Articles with example PHP code